The Roman Catholic Diocese of Lake Charles (Latin: Dioecesis Lacus Carolini), is a diocese of the Roman Catholic Church spanning Allen, Beauregard, Calcasieu, Cameron, and Jefferson Davis (civil) parishes in the southwest corner of the state of Louisiana.  The Cathedral of the Immaculate Conception in Lake Charles is its cathedral church, and Glen John Provost is the current diocesan bishop.  The diocese is a suffragan see of the Metropolitan Archdiocese of New Orleans.

History
Pope John Paul II canonically erected the Diocese of Lake Charles on 29 January 1980, taking its territory from the Roman Catholic Diocese of Lafayette in Louisiana, designating the Church of the Immaculate Conception in Lake Charles as its cathedral and making it a suffragan of the Metropolitan Archdiocese of New Orleans.

Sexual abuse

The Calcasieu Parish Sheriff's Office and Louisiana State Police arrested Mark Broussard, 56, on Thursday, March 22, 2012, on charges of abusing three boys as young as 8 years old while serving at Our Lady Queen of Heaven Catholic Church and St. Henry's Catholic Church in Lake Charles, La.  Broussard had subsequently served as pastor of St. Eugene Catholic Church in Grand Chenier, where he resigned from ministry in 1994.  At the time of his arrest, Broussard's personnel file contained documents indicating the Diocese of Lake Charles knew Broussard had sexual contact with at least four other children but these incidents were never reported to law enforcement.  The civil authorities eventually charged him with 224 counts of abuse, but subsequently consolidated the charges to 10 counts to ease the burden on the victims.  Three additional victims declined to pursue charges against Broussard.

Bishops

Bishops of Lake Charles
 Jude Speyrer (1980-2000)
 Edward Kenneth Braxton (2000-2005), appointed Bishop of Belleville
 Glen John Provost (2007–present)

Other priests of this diocese who became a bishop
 Sam Joseph Galip Jacobs, appointed Bishop of Alexandria in 1989

Mission statement
The mission statement of the diocese reads as follows:
The Diocese of Lake Charles embraces fully the mission of the Roman Catholic Church to preach the Gospel of Jesus Christ and the teachings of the Church in Southwest Louisiana by entering into the Mystery of the Life, Death, and Resurrection of Christ in the sacramental nature of the Catholic Church and with particular emphasis on the call to holiness, service to the poor and marginalized, the education of young people, the promotion of natural marriage and the family, fostering a respect for human life at all stages, responding to the needs of victims of violence and abuse, and witnessing faithfully to the Truth of Jesus Christ in local society and daily life.

Schools
The diocese operates six schools, including a high school, St. Louis Catholic High School.

References

External links
Roman Catholic Diocese of Lake Charles Official Site

Lake Charles
Lake Charles
1980 establishments in Louisiana
Lake Charles, Louisiana
Lake Charles
Lake Charles